Catocala cleopatra or Catocala faustina cleopatra is a moth of the family Erebidae. It is found from British Columbia south to California.

The wingspan is about 65 mm. Adults are on wing from June to September. There is probably one generation per year.

The larvae feed on Gleditsia triacanthos, Malus species, including Malus pumila, Prunus species, including Prunus americana and Prunus ilicifolia and Ulmus species.

References

External links
Species info

cleopatra
Moths described in 1874
Moths of North America